"Esskeetit"  (sometimes stylized in all caps) is a song by American rapper Lil Pump. The single and its music video were released on April 13, 2018. Written and produced alongside CBMix, the song debuted and peaked at number 24 on the Billboard Hot 100.

Background and release
The first snippet of the song was posted to Lil Pump's official Twitter account on February 6, 2018
. Pump previewed the song and its music video multiple times on Twitter and Instagram, originally intended to be released on April 8, 2018. However, its release was pushed back to April 13 due to copyright issues. The song takes its title from Pump's signature phrase. Lyrically, the song references drugs including Ecstasy (or X) and Actavis, along with luxury brands including Porsche, and Patek Phillipe, among others.

Music video
The song's music video, directed by Pump himself along with Ben Griffin, was premiered with its release. As of February 2023, the video has received over 530 million views on YouTube.

Live performance
On May 24, 2018, Pump performed "Esskeetit" on The Tonight Show Starring Jimmy Fallon.

Charts

Weekly charts

Year-end charts

Certifications

References

2018 singles
2018 songs
Lil Pump songs
Songs written by Lil Pump
Warner Records singles